is a Shinto shrine located in the city of Hida, Gifu Prefecture, Japan. It is commonly referred to as "Sugimoto-sama" (杉本さま).

History
The original construction of this shrine is unknown, but it is said to have been constructed during the Heian period. Ōkuninushi and Kinomata-no-kami (木俣神) are the main gods of the shrine, but Amaterasu is also worshipped here.

Recognition
Keta Wakamiya Shrine is one of the shrines included in the Furukawa festival, which is one of the three main naked festivals in Japan and is designated as an Intangible Cultural Properties of Japan.

See also
Keta Shrine
List of Shinto shrines

Shinto shrines in Gifu Prefecture